Clearmont can refer to:

 Clearmont, Missouri
 Clearmont, Wyoming